Balls Out may refer to:
 Balls Out (album), a 2011 album by Steel Panther
 Balls Out (2014 film), an American live-action/animated sports comedy film 
 Balls Out: Gary the Tennis Coach, a 2009 American sports comedy film